The Martonca (from the name "Martin") is a left tributary of the river Mureș in Transylvania, Romania. It discharges into the Mureș near Subcetate.

References

Rivers of Romania
Rivers of Harghita County